Zhang Xun (張勳, 1854-1923) was a Qing dynasty loyalist general who temporarily restored the abdicated emperor Puyi in 1917.

Zhang Xun or Chang Hsün may also refer to:

 Zhang Xun (Han dynasty) (張馴), Eastern Han dynasty scholar
 Zhang Xun (Tang dynasty) (張巡), Tang dynasty general involved in the Battle of Suiyang against An Lushan
 Zhang Xun (diplomat), China's Ambassador to Syria from 2011